Kiyohide (written: ,  or ) is a masculine Japanese given name. Notable people with the name include:

, Japanese basketball player
, Japanese daimyō
, Japanese politician
, Imperial Japanese Navy admiral
, Japanese karateka

Japanese masculine given names